"Wrong Again" is a song written by Cynthia Weil and Tommy Lee James, and recorded by American country music artist Martina McBride. It was released in September 1998 as the fourth single from McBride's Evolution album.  The song reached Number One on the Billboard Hot Country Singles & Tracks (now Hot Country Songs) charts.

Chart performance
"Wrong Again" debuted at number 70 on the U.S. Billboard Hot Country Singles & Tracks for the week of September 19, 1998.

Year-end charts

References

1998 singles
1998 songs
Martina McBride songs
Songs written by Tommy Lee James
Songs with lyrics by Cynthia Weil
Song recordings produced by Paul Worley
RCA Records Nashville singles